The Rings of Power are magical artefacts in J. R. R. Tolkien's legendarium, most prominently in his high fantasy novel The Lord of the Rings. The One Ring first appeared as a plot device, a magic ring in Tolkien's children's fantasy novel, The Hobbit; Tolkien later gave it a backstory and much greater power. He added nineteen other Great Rings, also conferring invisibility, that it could control, including the Three Rings of the Elves, Seven Rings for the Dwarves, and Nine for Men. He stated that there were in addition many lesser rings with minor powers. A key story element in The Lord of the Rings is the addictive power of the One Ring, made secretly by the Dark Lord Sauron, while the Nine Rings enslave their bearers as the Nazgûl (Ringwraiths), Sauron's most deadly servants.

Proposed sources of inspiration for the Rings of Power range from Germanic legend with the ring Andvaranaut and eventually Wagner's Der Ring des Nibelungen, to fairy tales such as Snow White, which features both a magic ring and seven dwarfs. One experience which may have been pivotal was Tolkien's professional work on a Latin inscription at the temple of Nodens; he was a god-hero linked to the Irish hero Nuada Airgetlám, whose epithet is "Silver-Hand", or in Elvish "Celebrimbor", the name of the Elven-smith who made the Rings of Power. The inscription contained a curse upon a ring, and the site was called Dwarf's Hill.

The Rings of Power have been described as symbolising the way that power conflicts with moral behaviour; Tolkien explores the way that different characters, from the humble gardener Sam Gamgee to the powerful Elf ruler Galadriel, the proud warrior Boromir to the Ring-addicted monster Gollum, interact with the One Ring. Tolkien stated that The Lord of the Rings was an examination of "placing power in external objects".

Fictional history 

The Rings of Power were forged by the Elven-smiths of the Noldorin settlement of Eregion. Best-known were the twenty Great Rings which conferred powers including invisibility, but many lesser rings with minor powers were also created at that time. The smiths were led by Celebrimbor, the grandson of Fëanor, the greatest craftsman of the Noldor, working with Dwarves from Khazad-dûm (Moria) led by his friend Narvi. Sauron, powerful and ambitious, but humiliated by the fall of his evil master Morgoth at the end of the First Age, had evaded the summons of the godlike Valar to surrender and face judgment; he chose to remain in Middle-earth and seek dominion over its people. In the Second Age, he arrived disguised as a handsome emissary of the Valar named Annatar, the Lord of Gifts, offering the knowledge to transform Middle-earth with the light of Valinor, the home of the Valar. He was shunned by the Elven leaders Gil-galad and Elrond in Lindon, but managed to persuade the Noldorin Elves of Eregion. With Sauron's help, they learnt to forge Rings of Power, creating the Seven and the Nine. While Celebrimbor created a set of Three on his own, Sauron left for Mordor and forged the One Ring, a master ring to control all the others, in the fires of Mount Doom.

When the One Ring was made using the Black Speech, the Elves immediately became aware of Sauron's true motive to control the other Rings. When Sauron set the completed One Ring upon his finger, the Elves quickly hid their rings. Celebrimbor entrusted one of the Three to Galadriel and sent the other two to Gil-galad and Círdan. In an attempt to seize all the Rings of Power for himself, Sauron waged an assault upon the Elves. He destroyed Eregion and captured the Nine. Under torture, Celebrimbor revealed where the Seven were, but refused to reveal the Three.

Toward the end of the Second Age, the Númenóreans took Sauron prisoner. Sauron however managed to corrupt the Men of Númenor, leading to their civilisation's eventual downfall. The exiled Númenóreans who survived, led by Elendil and his sons Isildur and Anárion, established the realms of Arnor and Gondor. Together with the Elves of Lindon, they formed the last alliance against Sauron and emerged victorious. Isildur cut the One Ring from Sauron's hand and kept it, refusing to destroy it; he was later killed in an ambush, and the Ring was lost for centuries. During this time, the Elves were able to use the Three Rings, while the Nine given to the leaders of Men corrupted their wearers and turned them into the Nazgûl. The Seven given to the Dwarves failed to subject them directly to Sauron's will but ignited a sense of avarice within them. Over the years, Sauron sought to recapture the Rings, primarily the One, but was only successful in recovering the Nine and three of the Seven. During the Third Age, the One Ring was discovered by Bilbo Baggins (in The Hobbit) and a Fellowship was formed to destroy it, led by Bilbo's heir Frodo. Following the successful destruction of the One Ring and the fall of Sauron, the power of the rings faded. While the Nine were destroyed, the Three were rendered powerless; their bearers left Middle-earth for Valinor at the end of the Third Age, inaugurating the Dominion of Men.

Description

As observed by Saruman, each Ring of Power was adorned with its "proper gem", except for the One Ring, which was unadorned.

The One

Unlike the other Rings of Power, the One was created as an unadorned gold band, though it bore Sauron's incantation, the Rhyme of the Rings, in the Black Speech; it became visible only when heated, whether by fire or by Sauron's hand. As the other Rings were made under the influence of Sauron, the power of all the Rings depended on the One Ring's survival. To make the One Ring, Sauron had to put almost all his power into it—when worn, it enhanced his power; unworn, it remained aligned to him unless another seized it and took control of it. A prospective possessor could, if sufficiently strong, overthrow Sauron and usurp his place; but they would become as evil as him. As the One was made in the fires of Mount Doom, it could only be unmade there. Sauron, being evil, never imagined that anyone might try to destroy the One Ring, as he imagined that anyone bearing it would be corrupted by it.

The Three 

Named for the three elements of fire, water, and air, the Three were the last to be made before Sauron's solo creation of the One. While Celebrimbor forged the Three Rings alone in Eregion, they were moulded by Sauron's craft and were bound to the One. Only after Sauron's defeat, when the One Ring was cut from his finger at the end of the Second Age, did the Elves begin to actively use the Three to ward off the decay brought by time. After the One Ring, they are the most powerful of the twenty Rings of Power. They are:

 Narya (the Ring of Fire, the Red Ring), from  Quenya nár, "fire", was set with a ruby. Its metal is not stated. It gave its wielder resistance to the weariness of time, and evoked hope in others. Its final bearer was the Wizard Gandalf, who received it from Círdan at the Grey Havens during the Third Age. 
 Nenya (the Ring of Water, the White Ring, the Ring of Adamant), from Quenya nén, "water", was made of mithril and set with a "shimmering white stone". Galadriel used it to protect and preserve the realm of Lothlórien. "Adamant" means both a type of stone, usually a diamond, and "stubbornly resolute", a description that equally well suits the quality of Galadriel's resistance to Sauron.

 Vilya (the Ring of Air, the Blue Ring), from Quenya vilya, "air", was the mightiest of the Three. It was made of gold and set with a sapphire. Elrond inherited Vilya from Gil-galad and used it to safeguard Rivendell.

The Seven

Sauron recovered the Seven Rings from information provided by Celebrimbor, and gave them to the leaders of the seven kindreds of the Dwarves: Durin's Folk (Longbeards), Firebeards, Broadbeams, Ironfists, Stiffbeards, Blacklocks, and Stonefoots, though a tradition of Durin's Folk claimed that Durin received his ring from the Elven-smiths. Over the years, Sauron was able to recover only three of the Seven rings from the Dwarves. The last of the three was seized from Thráin II during his captivity in Dol Guldur. Gandalf recounts to Frodo that the remaining four were consumed by dragons. Before the outbreak of the War of the Ring, an envoy from Sauron attempted to bribe Dain II Ironfoot of the Lonely Mountain with the three surviving rings and the lost realm of Moria in exchange for information leading to the recovery of the One Ring, but Dain refused.

The Nine

Sauron gave Nine of the Rings of Power to leaders of Men, who became "mighty in their day, kings, sorcerers, and warriors of old". They gained unending lifespans, and the ability to see things in worlds invisible to mortal Men. One by one, the Men fell to the power of the One Ring; by the end of the Second Age, all nine had become invisible ring-wraiths – the Nazgûl, Sauron's most terrible servants. In particular, they helped him search for the One Ring, to which they were powerfully attracted.

Powers

The Rings of Power were made using the craft taught by Sauron to give their wearers "wealth and dominion over others". Each Ring enhances the "natural power" of its possessor, thus approaching its "magical aspect", which can be "easily corruptible to evil and lust of domination". Gandalf explains that a Ring of Power is self-serving and can "look after itself": the One Ring, in particular, can "slip off treacherously" to return to its master Sauron, betraying its bearer when an opportunity arrives. As the Ruling Ring, the One enables a sufficiently powerful bearer to perceive what is done using the lesser rings and to govern the thoughts of their bearers. To use the One Ring to its full extent, the bearer needs to be strong and train their will to the domination of others.

A mortal Man or Hobbit who takes possession of a Ring of Power can manifest its power, becoming invisible and able to see things that are normally invisible, as the bearer is partly transported into the spirit world. However, they also "fade"; the Rings unnaturally extend their life-spans, but gradually transform them into permanently invisible wraiths. The Rings affect other beings differently. The Seven are used by their Dwarven bearers to increase their treasure hoards, but they do not gain invisibility, and Sauron was unable to bend the Dwarves to his will, instead only amplifying their greed and anger. Tom Bombadil, the only person unaffected by the power of the One Ring, could both see its wearer and remained visible when he wore it.

Unlike the other Rings, the main purpose of the Three is to "heal and preserve", as when Galadriel used Nenya to preserve her realm of Lothlórien over long periods. The Elves made the Three Rings to try to halt the passage of time, or as Tolkien had Elrond say, "to preserve all things unstained". This was seen most clearly in Lothlórien, which was free of both evil and the passage of time.
The Three do not make their wearers invisible. The Three had other powers: Narya could rekindle hearts with its fire and inspire others to resist tyranny, domination, and despair; Nenya had a secret power in its water that protected from evil; while Vilya healed and preserved wisdom in its element of air.

Analysis

Plot device to core element 

The One Ring first appeared in Tolkien's children's fantasy The Hobbit in 1937 as a plot device, a mysterious magic ring which the titular character had stumbled upon, but its origin was left unexplained. Following the novel's success, Tolkien was persuaded by his publishers Allen & Unwin to write a sequel. Intending to give Bilbo another adventure, he instead devised a background story around the Ring with its power of invisibility, forming a framework for the new work. He tied the Ring to mythical elements from the unfinished manuscripts for The Silmarillion to create an impression of depth in The Lord of the Rings. Gollum's characterisation in The Hobbit was revised for the second edition to bring it into line with his portrayal in The Lord of the Rings as a being addicted to the One Ring.

Tolkien's conception of Ring-lore was closely linked to his development of the One Ring. He initially made Sauron instrumental in forging the Rings. He then briefly considered having Fëanor, creator of the Silmarils, forge the Rings of Power, under the influence of Morgoth, the first Dark Lord. He settled on Celebrimbor, a descendant of Fëanor, as the Ring's principal maker, under the tutelage of Sauron, Morgoth's chief servant. While writing the lore behind the One Ring, Tolkien struggled with giving the Elven rings a "special status" – somehow linked to the One, and thus endangered by it, but also "unsullied", having no direct connection with Sauron. By the time he was writing the chapter "The Mirror of Galadriel", Tolkien had decided that the Seven and the Nine were made by the Elven-smiths of Eregion under Sauron's guidance and that the Three were made by Celebrimbor alone. He considered setting the Three free from the One when it was destroyed but dropped the idea. Tolkien's posthumous works, including The Silmarillion, Unfinished Tales and The History of Middle-earth offer further glimpses of the creation of the Rings.

Jason Fisher, writing in Tolkien Studies, notes that Tolkien developed the names, descriptions and powers of the Three Rings late and slowly through many drafts of his narratives. In Fisher's view, Tolkien found it difficult to work these Rings both into the existing story of the One Ring, and into the enormous but Ring-free Legendarium. Some of the descriptions, such as that Vilya was the mightiest of the Three, and that Narya was called "The Great", were added at the galley proof stage, just before printing. The Rings had earlier been named Kemen, Ëar, and Menel, meaning the Rings of Earth, Sea, and Heaven.

According to Johann Köberl, Tolkien struggled with the notion of a "special status" for the Elven-Rings, and considered having The Three set free when the One Ring was destroyed. In an unused draft by Tolkien, Galadriel counselled Celebrimbor to destroy all the Rings when Sauron's deception was revealed, but when he could not bear to ruin them, she suggested that the Three be hidden. According to Unfinished Tales, at the start of the War of the Elves and Sauron, Celebrimbor gave both Narya and Vilya to Gil-galad, High King of the Noldor. Gil-galad later entrusted Vilya to his lieutenant Elrond, and Narya to Círdan the Shipwright, Lord of the Havens of Mithlond and leader of the Falathrim or "People of the Shore". Tolkien suggested that Sauron did not discover where the Three were hidden, though he guessed that they were given to Gil-galad and Galadriel. In the published The Lord of the Rings, Gil-galad received only Vilya, while Círdan was the direct recipient of Narya from Celebrimbor. 

Tolkien noted in his letters that the primary power of the Three was to "the prevention and slowing of decay", which appealed to the Elves in their pursuit of preserving what they loved in Middle-earth. As changeless beings in a changing world, the Elves who remained in Middle-earth relied on the Three to delay the inevitable rise of the Dominion of Men. Tolkien explained that the Elves can only be immortal as long as the world endures, leading them to be concerned to burdens of deathlessness in time and change. Wanting the bliss and perfect memory of Valinor, and yet to remain in Middle-earth with their prestige as the fairest, as opposed to being at the bottom of the hierarchy in the Undying Lands, they became obsessed with "fading".

Inspiration 

The Tolkien scholar Tom Shippey thought that Tolkien's work on a Latin inscription at a Roman temple at Lydney Park a "pivotal" influence, combining as it did a god-hero, a ring, dwarves, and a silver hand. The god-hero was Nodens, whom Tolkien traced to the Irish hero Nuada Airgetlám, "Nuada of the Silver-Hand", and the inscription carried a curse on a stolen ring. "Silver-Hand" is the English translation of "Celebrimbor", the Elven-smith who made the Rings of Power, in association with the Dwarven-smith Narvi. The temple was at a place called Dwarf's Hill.

Magical rings occur in classical legend, in the form of Plato's Ring of Gyges which grants the power of invisibility to its wearer, though there is no suggestion that this influenced Tolkien. He was certainly influenced, however, by the Germanic legend: Andvaranaut is a magical ring that can give its wielder wealth, while Draupnir is a self-multiplying ring that holds dominion over all the rings it creates. Richard Wagner's opera series Der Ring des Nibelungen adapted Norse mythology to provide a magical but cursed golden ring. Tolkien denied any connection, but scholars agreed that Wagner's Ring powerfully influenced Tolkien. The scholar of religion Stefan Arvidsson writes that Tolkien's ring differs from Wagner's in being concerned with power for its own sake and that he turned one ring into many, an echo of the self-multiplying ring.

"Magic rings are a frequent motif in fairy tales; they confer powers such as invisibility or flight; they can summon wish-granting djinns and dwarves", writes the Tolkien and feminist scholar Melanie Rawls "identify the enchanted princess, hold the tiny golden key to the secret room, give one the power to transform oneself into any form — animal, vegetable, or mineral: duck, lake, rock or tree on a plain, and so escape the ogre." As Tolkien was well acquainted with fairy tales like The Brothers Grimm's Snow White and the Seven Dwarfs, which involves a magic ring, Jeanette White from Comic Book Resources suggested that his choice "to gift seven rings of power to the Dwarf Lords of the seven kingdoms is probably no accident".

Power and morality 

According to the scholars of philosophy Gregory Bassham and Eric Bronson, the Rings of Power can be seen as a modern representation of the relationship between power and morality, remarking that it portrays an idea that "absolute power is in conflict with behaviour that respects the wishes and needs of others". They also observed that several of Tolkien's characters have responded in different ways when faced with the possibility of possessing the One Ring—characters such as Samwise Gamgee and Galadriel have rejected it; Boromir and Gollum were seduced by its power; and Frodo Baggins, though in limited use, ultimately succumbs to it; while Tom Bombadil can transcend from its power entirely. They also noted that for Tolkien, the crucial moment of each character in the story is the moment in which they are tempted to use a Ring, a choice which will determine their fate. The science fiction author Isaac Asimov described the Rings of Power as symbols of industrial technology. While Tolkien denied that The Lord of the Rings was an allegory, he stated that it could be applied to situations and described it as an examination of "placing power in external objects".

In a 2019 article published by Kaspersky Lab, Nikolay Pankov analysed Sauron's efforts to dominate or ensnare the bearers of the Rings of Power from a modern perspective, with reference to the context of Tolkien's enthusiasm in the field of cryptanalysis as well as his participation in a language course run by the Government Code and Cypher School during the late 1930s. Pankov used analogies to real-world information security terms such as supply chain attacks, phishing techniques, and botnet software to describe the struggles between Sauron and the various Ring-bearers who are representatives of the Free Peoples of Middle-earth.

Catholicism 

Gwyneth Hood, writing in Mythlore, explores two Catholic elements in the story of the Three Rings: the angelic and sacrificial aspects of the elves in the War of the Ring. To the hobbits of the Fellowship of the Ring, the elven Ring-bearers appear as angelic messengers, offering wise counsel. To save Middle-earth, they have to accept the plan to destroy the One Ring, and with it, the power of the Three Rings, which embody much of their own power. Hood notes that while Gandalf as one of the supernatural Maiar sent from Valinor is "remarkably unlike an elf", out of the wielders of the Three Rings he is the character who most closely combines the angelic and the sacrificial. The poet W. H. Auden, an early supporter of Lord of the Rings, wrote in the Tolkien Journal that good triumphs over evil in the War of the Ring, but the Three Rings lose their power, as Galadriel had prophesied: "If you succeed, then our power is diminished, and Lothlórien will fade, and the tide of time will sweep it away". Hood further writes that Tolkien was suggesting technology such as the making of Rings of Power is in itself neither good nor evil; both the Elves and Sauron (with his armies of orcs) use that technology, as they also both make and wear swords and mail armour, and shoot with bows.

In adaptations

Ralph Bakshi's 1978 animated film The Lord of the Rings begins with the forging of the Rings of Power and the events of the War of the Last Alliance against Sauron, all of which are animated in a silhouette against a red background using rotoscoping.

The forging of the Rings of Power opens the prologue of Peter Jackson's The Lord of the Rings film series in the 2001 The Fellowship of the Ring. The Three Elven Rings are shown being cast using a cuttlebone mould, an ancient casting technique. These were given to Gil-galad (portrayed by Mark Ferguson), Círdan (Michael Elsworth), and Galadriel (Cate Blanchett). The Tolkien illustrator Alan Lee, employed as a conceptual designer for the films, had a cameo as one of the nine human Ring-bearers who later became the Nazgûl. Sauron (Sala Baker) is seen forging the One Ring at the chamber of Mount Doom. The One Ring was shown to have the ability to adjust in size to the finger of its wearer, such as when it became smaller to fit Isildur (Harry Sinclair). In the extended version, Galadriel properly introduces Nenya, the Ring of Adamant, to Frodo. In the concluding film, The Return of the King (2003), the final wearers of the Three Rings—Gandalf (Ian McKellen), Elrond (Hugo Weaving), and Galadriel, appear openly at the Grey Havens wearing the Three, with Galadriel proclaiming the end of its power and the beginning of the Dominion of Men.

Four Rings of Power appeared in Jackson's The Hobbit film series. In An Unexpected Journey (2012), the One Ring was found by Bilbo Baggins (portrayed by Martin Freeman). In the extended version of the succeeding film The Desolation of Smaug (2013), Gandalf discovers that Sauron took the Ring of Thrór (a Dwarf-Lord) from Thráin (Antony Sher), who revealed in a flashback scene his possession of the Ring during a siege of Moria. In the concluding film The Battle of the Five Armies (2014), Galadriel (Blanchett) reveals Nenya in rescuing Gandalf (McKellen) from Sauron (Benedict Cumberbatch), aided by Saruman (Christopher Lee) and Elrond (Weaving), who is wearing Vilya, the Ring of Air.

In the 2014 video game Middle-earth: Shadow of Mordor, the wraith-like spirit of Celebrimbor (fused with the body of the Ranger Talion) recalls how Sauron had deceived him into forging the Rings of Power. In the sequel, Middle-earth: Shadow of War, Celebrimbor forges a new Ring of Power unsullied by Sauron's influence.

The 2022 television series The Lord of the Rings: The Rings of Power depicts the forging of the Rings of Power.

See also
The Palantíri – indestructible crystal stones that enable their users to communicate with users of the other stones
The Silmarils – three jewels containing the light of the Two Trees of Valinor and the chief objects of The Silmarillion

References

Primary
This list identifies each item's location in Tolkien's writings.

Secondary

Sources 

 
 
 
 
 
 
 
 
 
 
 
 
 
 
 
 
 
   

Fictional elements introduced in 1954
Middle-earth rings and jewels
Magic rings